Brownsboro-Zorn is a neighborhood in northeast Louisville, Kentucky, United States.  Its boundaries are Brownsboro Road to the south, Birchwood Avenue to the west, Mellwood Avenue to the north, and Mockingbird Valley to the east.  Residential development began in 1911 between Birchwood and Zorn Avenue, a wide street which bisects the neighborhood.  The core of the neighborhood is residential, but there is substantial commerce along Brownsboro Road.  The Veterans Affairs Medical Center is located along Zorn.

Sarah Knox Taylor, the daughter of former president Zachary Taylor, married Jefferson Davis in a house that stood at the corner of Brownsboro and Zorn in 1835.

Demographics
As of 2000, the population of Brownsboro-Zorn was 2,232 , of which 88.9% is white, 9.7% is black, 1.2% is listed as other, and 0.3% is Hispanic. College graduates are 51.5% of the population, people w/o a high school degree are 9.0%. Females outnumber males 53.6% to 46.4%.

References

External links
Street map of Brownsboro-Zorn
Zorn (Louisville, Ky.)/field/coveraa/mode/exact/conn/and/order/title/ad/asc/cosuppress/0    Images of Brownsboro Zorn (Louisville, Ky.) in the University of Louisville Libraries Digital Collections

Neighborhoods in Louisville, Kentucky
Populated places established in 1911
1911 establishments in Kentucky